Stichopterus is an extinct genus of chondrostean ray-finned fish that lived during the Early Cretaceous  epoch in Asia. It has been found in Russia (Murtoi Formation) and Mongolia. 

The type species, Stichopterus woodwardi, was named and described in 1909. Since then, up to three other species have been named or were reallocated to Stichopterus, respectively.  

Stichopterus is similar to Peipiaosteus from China. Both genera belong to the family Peipiaosteidae, together with Liaosteus, Spherosteus, and Yanosteus. Peipiaosteidae are extinct relatives of Modern sturgeons and paddlefishes (Acipenseroidei).

See also
 Prehistoric fish
 List of prehistoric bony fish

References

Cretaceous fish
Cretaceous fish of Asia
Fossil taxa described in 1909
Acipenseriformes